Bale is a surname. People with that name include:

 Christian Bale (born 1974), English actor born in Wales
 David Bale (1941–2003), South African entrepreneur
 Edward Turner Bale (1810–1849), English physician
 Elvin Bale (born 1945), English circus daredevil
 Ernest Bale (1878–1952), English cricketer
 Gareth Bale (born 1989), Welsh footballer
 John Bale (1496–1563), English churchman and playwright
 John Bale (baseball) (born 1974), baseball player
 Lan Bale (born 1969), former South African tennis player
 Qoriniasi Bale (1941–2014), Fijian lawyer and politician
 Sue Bale, British nursing researcher and administrator
 John de Bale, Member of Parliament in 1302

English-language surnames